The men's 3000 metres steeplechase event at the 2001 Summer Universiade was held in Beijing, China on 29 August.

Results

References

Athletics at the 2001 Summer Universiade
2001